Varona Football Club is a Ni-Vanuatu football association that participates in the Port Vila Football League. Varona FC finished in 9th place in the PVFA League - Second division in 2016.

References 

Football clubs in Vanuatu